The Alister Clark Memorial Rose Garden is the most complete collection in Australia of the surviving roses of "the great Australian rose breeder, Alister Clark"  (1864–1949). It is situated near "Glenara", his old house and garden in Bulla, Victoria, 10 km NW of Melbourne Airport. There are at least 150 named roses by Alister Clark and many more plausibly attributed to him.  Of these 83 are known to survive, though the authenticity of some is disputed and another eight only survive outside Australia.

The garden is maintained by volunteers coordinated by the Hume City Council.

Roses in the garden
Below is an illustrated list of surviving Alister Clark roses in the Memorial Garden. Several related roses are also grown there. The list has been compiled from the brochure Alister Clark Memorial Garden of Hume City Council; and the online list established by Help Me Find Roses for Clark, Alister. Biographical detail comes from the Govanstones' The Women Behind the Roses. Further detail is from Susan Irvine's A Hillside of Roses. Roses putatively named after racehorses have been checked against the Pedigree Online Thoroughbred Database.

'Baxter Beauty' is the sport of an Alister Clark rose, not an Alister Clark rose itself. Nor is Rosa gigangtea, a species rose he frequently bred from. "Glenara No. 14", "Madge Taylor" and "Not Tonner's Fancy" (not shown) were found in his garden at "Glenara" and may be Clark roses. 'Broadway' was found at Mrs Oswin's in Broadway, Camberwell, Victoria and is probably a Clark Hybrid Gigantea. Clark's Hybrid Giganteas are often once flowering, but for a long period. They tend to be at their best in the Memorial Garden at Christmas, though 'Courier', 'Tonner's Fancy' and 'Pennant' are better in early Spring.

Nearly all the photos below were taken in the Alister Clark Memorial Rose Garden.

See also

 Alister Clark
 List of Alister Clark roses

References

Rose gardens in Australia
 Gardens in Victoria
Buildings and structures in the City of Hume